Riccia is a genus of liverworts in the order Marchantiales.

These plants are small and thalloid, that is not differentiated into root, stem and leaf. Depending on species, the thallus may be strap-shaped and about 0.5 to 4 mm wide with dichotomous branches or may form rosettes or hemirosettes up to 3 cm in diameter, that may be gregarious and form intricate mats.

The thallus is dorsiventrally differentiated. Its upper (dorsal) surface is green and chlorophyll-bearing, with a mid-dorsal longitudinal sulcus (furrow or groove). Air pores occasionally break through the dorsal surface, giving the thallus a dimpled appearance. In exceptional members such as Riccia caroliniana   of Northern Australia and Riccia sahyadrica  of Western Ghats, the photosynthetic region is confined to the lower half of the thallus. 

The lower (ventral) surface has a mid-ventral ridge bearing multicellular scales that originate as a single row but normally separate into two rows as the thallus widens.  The scales are multicellular and hyaline (glassy) in appearance, or violet due to the pigment anthocyanin.

Rhizoids are nearly lacking in aquatic forms, but there are usually numerous unicellular rhizoids of two types on the ventral surface. One type is called smooth and the other type is the pegged or tuberculated rhizoids; these help in anchorage and absorption. The inner surface of the smooth rhizoids is smooth while that of the tuberculate rhizoid will have internal cell wall projections.

Plants are usually monoicous, and sexual reproduction is by antheridia and archegonia. Asexual reproduction occurs by spores, by fragmentation of the rosettes, and by formation of apical tubers. Spores are large (45 to 200 µ) and formed in tetrads.

One of the more than 100 species in this genus is the "slender riccia" (Riccia fluitans), which grows on damp soil or, less commonly, floating in ponds, and is sometimes used in aquariums.

The sporophyte of Riccia is the simplest amongst bryophytes. It consist of only a capsule, missing both foot and seta, and does not perform photosynthesis.

References 

Ricciaceae
Marchantiales genera